Kalateh-ye Kazem (also Romanized as Kalāteh-ye Kāz̧em and Kalāteh-e Kāz̧em) is a village in Bala Velayat Rural District, Bala Velayat District, Bakharz County, Razavi Khorasan Province, Iran. At the 2006 census, its population was 816, in 164 families.

References 

Populated places in Bakharz County